Enrique Flores Magón (13 April 1877 – 28 October 1954) was a Mexican journalist and politician, associated with the Mexican Liberal Party and anarchism. His name is most frequently linked with that of his elder brother, Ricardo Flores Magón, and the political philosophy they espoused, magonismo. Another brother was Jesús Flores Magón.

Biography
He was born in Teotitlán del Camino
(since renamed Teotitlán de Flores Magón) in the state of Oaxaca on 13 April 1877,
to Margarita Magón and Teodoro Flores, a Nahua who had fought in Benito Juárez's Liberal Army.
At an early age the family relocated to Mexico City. He was a student in the capital in 1884 when demonstrations broke out against the third re-election of President Porfirio Díaz.
By 1902 he and his brother Ricardo, working on the anti-Díaz broadsheet El Hijo del Ahuizote, were arrested and incarcerated in the military prison at Santiago Tlatelolco. While in prison the brothers explored the ideas of writers such as Kropotkin, Faure, Errico Malatesta, Maxim Gorki, and Proudhon and discussed the possibility of disseminating anarchist ideas in Mexico.

Upon their release from prison in January 1903, the brothers returned to publishing  El Hijo del Ahuizote and, on 5 February of that year, Enrique Flores Magón drew a banner declaring "The Constitution is Dead", which they hung in front of its offices.

On 2 April 1903, they and other liberals stormed a pro-Díaz demonstration and succeeded in turning it into an anti-Díaz event, calling for the dictator's death. On 11 April Enrique Flores Magón was arrested again; he was later released, but subject to a ban on publishing any written materials. As a result, Enrique and Ricardo left Mexico for the United States, arriving in Laredo, Texas in late 1903.

Enrique lived in several cities around the U.S. and Canada, concealing his identity, constantly changing address, and frequently losing contact with Ricardo. In St. Louis, he helped draft the platform of the Mexican Liberal Party (PLM).

He recommenced publication in the United States of the newspaper  Regeneración,
which the brothers had founded in 1900, and organized a clandestine network for its distribution in Mexico. He continued in these endeavors until 1917, when he left the Organizing Committee of the  PLM and the Regeneración editorial team.

Following Ricardo's death in 1922, he returned to Mexico in 1923, where he had a series of disagreements with former Magonistas. In 1933, he helped leaders of the National Agrarian League found the Confederación Campesina Mexicana in San Luis Potosí.

He died in Mexico City on 28 October 1954.

See also 
 Magonism

References

External links 
 
 

Mexican journalists
Male journalists
Mexican anarchists
People of the Mexican Revolution
Magonists
Mexican revolutionaries
Mexican democracy activists
1877 births
1954 deaths
People from Oaxaca
Porfiriato